Yegai or Yegavi or Ye Gavi may refer to:
Yegavi, Izeh
Ye Gavi, Susan